Sodium myreth sulfate is a mixture of organic compounds with both detergent and surfactant properties. It is found in many personal care products such as soaps, shampoos, and toothpaste. It is an inexpensive and effective foaming agent.  Typical of many detergents, sodium myreth sulfate consists of several closely related compounds. Sometimes the number of ethylene glycol ether units (n) is specified in the name as myreth-n sulfate, for example myreth-2 sulfate.

Production
Sodium myreth sulfate is very similar to sodium laureth sulfate; the only difference is two more carbons in the fatty alcohol portion of the hydrophobic tail. It is manufactured by ethoxylation (hence the "eth" in "myreth") of myristyl alcohol.  Subsequently, the terminal OH group is converted to the sulfate by treatment with chlorosulfuric acid.

Safety
Like other ethoxylates, sodium myreth sulfate may become contaminated with 1,4-dioxane during production, which is considered to be a Group 2B suspect carcinogen by the IARC.

See also 
Ammonium lauryl sulfate

References

External links
 Household product database  at NIH web site.

Cosmetics chemicals
Ethers
Household chemicals
Organic sodium salts
Anionic surfactants
Sulfate esters